E71 can refer to:
 King's Indian Defense, Encyclopaedia of Chess Openings code
 Nokia E71
 European route E71
 BMW E-71
 Kansai-Kūkō Expressway (includes Sky Gate Bridge R), route E71 in Japan